John Souter may refer to:
 John Bulloch Souter, Scottish painter, sculptor, and illustrator
 John Souter (cricketer), New Zealand cricketer